Saway-yanga is a former  Tongva (Fernandeño) Native American settlement in Los Angeles County, California.

It was located near Mission San Fernando Rey de España in the San Fernando Valley.

See also
Category: Tongva populated places
Tongva language
Spanish missions in California
California mission clash of cultures
Ranchos of California

References

Tongva
History of the San Fernando Valley
Former Native American populated places in California
Former populated places in California
Tongva populated places
Former settlements in Los Angeles County, California
Native Americans in Los Angeles